Album of the Year is the fourth studio album by hip hop producer and rapper Black Milk, which was released on September 14, 2010 by Fat Beats. Production for the album was handled by himself, with assistance by Will Sessions.

Track listing
"365"
"Welcome (Gotta Go)"
"Keep Going"
"Oh Girl" (featuring AB)
"Deadly Medley" (featuring Royce da 5'9" & Elzhi)
"Distortion" (featuring Melanie Rutherford)
"Over Again" (featuring Monica Blaire)
"Round of Applause"
"Black and Brown" (featuring Danny Brown)
"Warning (Keep Bouncing)"
"Gospel Psychedelic Rock" (featuring Melanie Rutherford & AB)
"Closed Chapter" (featuring Mr. Porter)

Charts

References

2010 albums
Black Milk albums
Albums produced by Black Milk
Fat Beats Records albums